Jessica Julie Anne Garlick (born 1981) is an English-born Welsh pop singer. Garlick made her first steps into show business when she was 16. At that age, she won the Welsh final of BBC One's talent show Star for a Night. The same year she also featured in Michael Barrymore's My Kind of Music. She is the second-highest placed British entrant at the Eurovision Song Contest in the 21st century, coming joint third in the 2002 contest.

Background 
Garlick was born in Derby, Derbyshire, England.  She was educated at Glan-y-Mor Comprehensive School and is a member of the Church of Jesus Christ of Latter-day Saints (LDS Church).

Before appearing on Pop Idol she had been on various TV talent shows including Michael Barrymore's My Kind of Music and Star for a Night.

Pop Idol and the Eurovision Song Contest 
In 2001, she was among the last ten contestants on the ITV talent show Pop Idol. The BBC later invited her to sing "Come Back", one of the competing songs in A Song for Europe, the British selection for the Eurovision Song Contest 2002. The audience selected her to represent the United Kingdom at the event in Tallinn, where she took her country to its best result since Imaani's "Where Are You?" in 1998, finishing joint third alongside Estonia's representative, Sahlene.

After Eurovision 
Later in 2002 Garlick was involved in a campaign to help children stop smoking. She made a guest appearance in the 2003 Song for Europe, during which she was charged with announcing the results of the Welsh televote, which handed top marks to the ill-fated Jemini. Later in the year, she appeared in Liquid Eurovision preview and analysis programmes.

On 16 November 2006, Garlick appeared as the hidden musician in the 'Identity Parade' round on the BBC's Never Mind the Buzzcocks game show.  She is now married to Owen Satterley, a personal trainer whom she has dated from her teenage years. They have a daughter called Olivia and a son called Noah.

Later career 
It was announced in early 2009 that Garlick would be making a return to music. The début single from her unreleased album, Hard Not to Fall, was released on 11 May 2009, one day before the first Eurovision Song Contest semi-final. The single was only available to purchase from iTunes. She recorded a music video which was posted on her official website. Garlick performed the new single, along with her Eurovision entry, "Come Back", at the UK Eurovision Preview Party, at Scala, King's Cross, on 17 April 2009.

Chart discography

References

External links 
 

1981 births
Eurovision Song Contest entrants for the United Kingdom
Eurovision Song Contest entrants of 2002
Living people
People from Kidwelly
Pop Idol contestants
Singers from Carmarthenshire
21st-century Welsh women singers
Welsh Latter Day Saints